StarDunk is a video game for the Android as well as the iOS. It was made by Godzi Lab and released for the iPhone, iPad, and iPod Touch. The game has a sequel titled StarDunk Gold. It has achieved over 4 million downloads.

Gameplay 
StarDunk is a basketball game where the objective is to shoot the ball through the hoop. Set in space, it is a massively multiplayer game where the player competes at shooting against other players, in a space backdrop.

Reception 

StarDunk has received positive reviews. AndroidTapp gave it a maximum five stars, saying that it is "huge, online multiplayer, basketballing extravaganza". TouchArcade praised the game, saying "Star Dunk is an entertaining take on a popular sport that should have the competitive types champing at the bit for a long time to come" but criticized the fact that there is no way to challenge friends directly. Gamezebo scored StarDunk 3.5/5.

References

External links 
Official site

Android (operating system) games
Basketball video games
IOS games
Multiplayer and single-player video games
Playdigious games